Nasser Sultan Shraideh (born 1967) is the Jordanian Deputy Prime Minister for Economic Affairs and Minister of State for Public Sector Modernisation. He was appointed as minister on 27 October 2022. Previously he had served as Minister of Planning and International Cooperation between 12 October 2020 and 27 October 2022.

Education 
Shraideh holds a Bachelor in Economics (1988) and a Master in Economics (1995) from the Yarmouk University.

References 

1967 births
Living people
21st-century Jordanian politicians
Government ministers of Jordan
Planning ministers of Jordan

Yarmouk University alumni